Norman Pearson may refer to:

 Norman Pearson (musician), American orchestral tuba player
 Norman Pearson (priest) (1787–1865), English priest and theologian
 Norman Holmes Pearson (1909–1975), American academic, author, editor, critic, and archivist